Eben Vorster (born 23 April 1997) is a South African swimmer. He competed in the men's 200 metre freestyle event at the 2019 World Aquatics Championships.

References

1997 births
Living people
Male butterfly swimmers
South African male freestyle swimmers
People from Bellville, South Africa
South African male swimmers
Swimmers at the 2018 Commonwealth Games
Commonwealth Games competitors for South Africa
Sportspeople from the Western Cape
Competitors at the 2019 Summer Universiade
Pittsburgh Panthers men's swimmers
21st-century South African people
20th-century South African people